The Zastava 750 (Застава 750) was a supermini made by the Serbian car maker Zavod Crvena Zastava in Kragujevac. It was a version of the Fiat 600 made under licence from 1962  and was longer than the Fiat version. The Zastava 750 has a  engine, which produces . It is the smallest car ever made by Zastava. Later on during production, in 1980, the Zastava 850 was introduced. It is nearly identical to the Zastava 750 but the engine had a larger capacity. The Zastava 850 is harder to find than the 750 model but both are still widely available in former Yugoslavia.

The Zastava 750 is widely known by its nickname "Fića" (Фићa) in Serbian, "Fićo" in Bosnian and Croatian, by "Fičo" or "Fičko" in Slovene and by "Fikjo" (Фиќо) in Macedonian. The nickname "Fića" comes from the main character of a comic published by the newspaper Borba during the first years of the car's production.

Development

The Yugoslavian-built Zastava 600 was a version of the Fiat 600 built under license. Production commenced in 1955, and the model was upgraded with a larger engine in September 1960. It received a Zastava 750 badge in 1962. The 750 retained frontal suicide doors (rear-hinged) until 1969. Later it got bigger front lights, autoadjusting brakes, seatbelts, slightly improved interior and many other small improvements. The later Zastava 850 had many improvements from the original model, but it retained the same 600 body style. The 750 used a 25 hp (30 hp in the 750 SE) 767 cc engine, while the 850 received an 848 cc version providing 32 hp and a useful dollop of extra torque.

Production of the Zastava 750 began on 18 October 1955 and ended on 18 November 1985. The car's popularity has started increasing in the last years, partly from the low fuel consumption and very cheap price as a second hand vehicle. Also it starting to become a symbol for nostalgia, and many youngsters that need cheap utilitarian vehicle with a bohemian status symbol are buying this car as a second hand vehicle. Because of that prices have risen in the last couple of years and many fan clubs have emerged.

Colombian assembly

The Zastava 750 was also assembled in Colombia — next to a variety of American Jeeps as well as other Fiat models — by Leonidas Lara (C.C.A.) in Bogotá. It was sold in Colombia as the "Fiat 750Z", from 1977 until 1984. The 750Z was built in comparatively large numbers for the first three years, after which production slowed down considerably. This was due to CCA becoming Mazda's local subsidiary, favoring production of the more profitable Japanese cars.

References

750
Cars of Serbia
Subcompact cars
Hatchbacks
1960s cars
1970s cars
1980s cars
Rear-engined vehicles